Woodruff High School is a public secondary school in Woodruff, South Carolina, United States, and is the only high school in Spartanburg County School District 4.

History

The original Woodruff High School was built in 1908 on East Georgia Street.

The next high school was built in 1925 in downtown Woodruff. It is a Collegiate Gothic building designed by Frank H. Cunningham and Joseph G. Cunningham. This building was the high school until 1953; it then became a junior high school until the 1960s, and an elementary school after that. The City of Woodruff bought the school and converted it into the city hall and police station in 1978.

The building was nominated for the National Register of Historic Places as "Woodruff High School" on May 31, 2006, and added to the Register on October 18, 2006 with the identification number 06000578.

The following high school was opened in September 1953.

On January 11, 1987, Woodruff High School that was opened in 1953 was destroyed by fire.  Rob Johnson, who was a student at the time. explains that he "woke up that Sunday morning to see large plumes of smoke filling the sky."  Living just 2 blocks from the school, he "ran over to find the school engulfed in flames." He knew that the school would be built back even better because his father, Robert Lee Johnson, had been hired as the Comptroller for the District the year before and had evaluated all the school insurance policies.  His father "encouraged Superintendent William Howell to substantially raise the insurance policies on all the school buildings once he has discovered the buildings in the district were under insured."  The rock band, REO Speedwagon heard about the school burning and that the Seniors would not have a place to have their prom.  The band decided to have a concert at the Greenville Memorial Auditorium to help raise money for the Seniors.  Later the band raised money for the re-building of the school with a concert at Clemson University. The new High School that is still being used today was completed for the 1989 school year which started August 13th.

Athletics

State championships 
 Baseball: 1947, 1958
 Basketball - Girls: 1921, 1963, 1964, 1966, 1967
 Football: 1956, 1957, 1964, 1975, 1976, 1977, 1978, 1980, 1983, 1984
 Golf - Boys: 2021
 Tennis - Boys: 1975, 
 Track - Boys: 1979, 1980, 1982, 1984, 1985, 1994
 Wrestling: 1978, 1982, 1983, 2001

References

External links
 Woodruff High School — official school site
 National Register Properties in South Carolina: Woodruff High School — state website about the 1923 building, with photographs, description, and HRHP nomination form

Educational institutions established in 1908
1908 establishments in South Carolina
School buildings completed in 1908
Public high schools in South Carolina
Schools in Spartanburg County, South Carolina
School buildings on the National Register of Historic Places in South Carolina
National Register of Historic Places in Spartanburg County, South Carolina